Poul Thymann (10 May 1888 – 12 October 1971) was a Danish rower who competed in the 1912 Summer Olympics. He was the strokeman of the Danish boat, which won the bronze medal in the coxed fours.

References

External links
profile

1888 births
1971 deaths
Danish male rowers
Rowers at the 1912 Summer Olympics
Olympic rowers of Denmark
Olympic bronze medalists for Denmark
Olympic medalists in rowing
Medalists at the 1912 Summer Olympics